The Asia Oceania Floorball Confederation (AOFC) is a floorball confederation consisting of 15 nations spanning across 2 continents, Asia and Oceania.

The AOFC organizes the men's and women's Asia Pacific Floorball Championships every year.

History
The AOFC was formed during the 2005 Women's World Floorball Championships, when the national associations of Australia, India, Japan, Korea, Malaysia, Pakistan, and Singapore, alongside the International Floorball Federation, decided to form a Confederation in conjunction with the 2004 Asia Pacific Floorball Championships.

Organization
The AOFC, like other IFF member nations, has a central board consisting of a President, Vice-President, Treasurer, Secretary General, and regional members.

The last AOFC general assembly was held in Singapore in 2018 during the 1st Women's AOFC Cup.

Central Board

Nations
The AOFC currently consists of 19 member associations:

Development
Bangladesh
Jordan
Nepal
Qatar
Sri Lanka
United Arab Emirates

See also  
List of Asia Pacific Floorball Champions

Citations

Floorball governing bodies
Floorball in Asia
Floorball in Oceania
2005 establishments in Asia
2005 establishments in Oceania